"My Side of the Bed" is a song by American singer Susanna Hoffs, released in 1990 as the lead single from her debut solo album, When You're a Boy. It was written by Hoffs, Tom Kelly and Billy Steinberg, and produced by David Kahne. "My Side of the Bed" reached No. 30 on the Billboard Hot 100.

Charts

Year-end charts

References

1991 debut singles
1990 songs
Susanna Hoffs songs
Songs written by Billy Steinberg
Songs written by Tom Kelly (musician)
Songs written by Susanna Hoffs
Song recordings produced by David Kahne